Point Bridge can refer to:
Point Bridge (Pittsburgh), a steel cantilever truss bridge that spanned the Monongahela River in Pittsburgh, Pennsylvania
PointBridge, an IT consulting company
Dames Point Bridge, a cable-stayed bridge over the St. Johns River in Jacksonville, Florida 
The West Point Bridge Design Contest, a competition for middle school and high school students organized by the United States Military Academy
Point Bridge Capital, an investment company known for "MAGA ETF"